Concha Valdés Miranda (July 16, 1928 - August 19, 2017) was a Cuban songwriter and performer of Cuban music.

Miranda was born in Havana, Cuba. Her greatest success may have been "El que más te ha querido". It was nominated for the Grammy and the first place in the United States. In addition, she is the author of numerous songs that were popular in the voices of performers such as Toña la Negra, Celia Cruz, Lucía Méndez, Olga Guillot, Tito Rodríguez, Felipe Pirela, Los Panchos, Gilberto Santa Rosa, Santos Colón, Floria Márquez, Ismael Miranda, Tito Nieves, Tito Puente,  Sergio Vargas, Johnny Ventura, Cheo Feliciano and Dyango, among others.

Many of her compositions have been used as themes in Spanish and Mexican movies. She is among the first artists to become part of the composers of Latin Songwriters Hall of Fame. She died in Miami, aged 89.

Songs 

 El que más te ha querido
 El viaje
 La mitad
 Como es possible
 Házmelo otra vez
 Tápame contigo
 Orgasmo
 Un poco de ti
 Haz lo que tu quieras
 Lo puro
 Mi principio y mi final
 Ven a vivir conmigo
 Tú te lo pierdes
 Aburrida
 En el medio de la vida
 Como antes
 Las cosas buenas de la vida
 Un poco de ti
 Hoy es viernes
 Dos milagros
 Eso que dices de mí
 Voy a quitarme el luto
 Déjame ser
 Voy a ver si me acuerdo
 En el libro de mi vida
 Sangre de bolero
 Mi mujer
 Estás jugando conmigo
 Nuestro amor
 Cuánto te quiero
 Algo me dice que no
 Cariño mio
 Lo nuestro
 Yo no lo sabía
 Señor Usted
 Estoy buscando un hombre
 Doctor

Discography 

 Concha Valdes Miranda interpreta sus canciones, (LD) KUBANEY MT 323
 Concha Valdes Miranda: Erotismo y osadía, (LD) RODVEN 2012.

Movies 

 Tápame contigo (1970) Tápame contigo
 Sauna (1990) Sauna
 Jamón Jamón (1992) Jamón, Jamón

References

External links 
 BMI Members Honored at Inaugural Latin Songwriters Hall of Fame Induction Gala
 Dyango, El que mas te ha querido, Festival de Viña 1990

1928 births
2017 deaths
Cuban women singers
Latin music songwriters
Women in Latin music
Musicians from Havana